The Archer is a 1982 Finnish film directed by Taavi Kassila. The plot concerns a young drug dealer who is taken in and reformed by an old man who also teaches his archery.

Cast
Kari Heiskanen
Åke Lindman
Eeva Eloranta
Vesa Vierikko
Jarkko Rantanen
Pekka Laiho

References

External links 
 

1982 films
1982 drama films
Finnish thriller drama films